Operation Sidewinder may refer to:

 Operation Sidewinder, a coalition military operation of the Iraq War
 Operation Sidewinder (play), by Sam Shepard, 1970